The 2018 season was the Dallas Cowboys' 59th in the National Football League (NFL), their 30th under the ownership of Jerry Jones, their 10th playing their home games at AT&T Stadium, and their eighth full season under head coach Jason Garrett. AT&T Stadium also became the first stadium venue to host the annual draft. For the first time since 2009, wide receiver Dez Bryant was not on the opening day roster, as he was released on April 13, 2018 and later signed with the New Orleans Saints on November 7, 2018. For the first time since 2002, tight end Jason Witten was not on the opening day roster, having announced his retirement on May 3, 2018. For the first time since 2010, kicker Dan Bailey was not on the opening day roster, as he was released on September 1, 2018.

The Cowboys clinched the NFC East division following a Week 16 win over the Tampa Bay Buccaneers and a week later, improved their 9–7 record from the previous season with a win over the New York Giants.

In the playoffs, the Cowboys defeated the Seattle Seahawks 24–22 in the Wild Card round and advanced to the Divisional round, where they lost to the eventual NFC champion Los Angeles Rams 22–30, suffering both their 6th straight Divisional playoff defeat and 8th straight road playoff loss. The Cowboys would not return to the playoffs until 2021.

Offseason

Signings

(†) - Later Released

Re-Signings

Acquisitions

Departures

Draft

Notes
The Cowboys were awarded one fourth-round, two fifth-round and one sixth-round compensatory picks (137th, 171st, 173rd and 208th overall).
The Cowboys traded their fifth-round selection (157th overall) to the New York Jets in exchange for the Jets' sixth-round selection in 2017 (191st overall).
The Cowboys traded their fifth-round selection (173rd overall) to Oakland in exchange for Oakland's sixth-round selection (192nd overall) and fullback Jamize Olawale.
The Cowboys traded their sixth-round selection (192nd overall) to the Los Angeles Rams in exchange for wide receiver Tavon Austin.

Staff

Rosters

Opening preseason roster

Week one roster

Final roster

Preseason

Regular season

Schedule
The Cowboys' 2018 schedule was announced on April 19.

Note: Intra-division opponents are in bold text.

Game summaries

Week 1: at Carolina Panthers

Despite a strong showing from the defense, the Cowboys offense only managed to get 8 points and fumbled late in the game, allowing the Panthers to run out the clock. This loss would start the Cowboys season at 0–1.

Week 2: vs. New York Giants

Dak Prescott threw his first touchdown pass of the year to Tavon Austin from 64 yards out on the 3rd play of the game. Ezekiel Elliott rushed for his second touchdown of the year. Brett Maher made his first two field goals as a Cowboy. The defense recorded 6 sacks and a fumble recovery. This win improved the Cowboys to 1-1.

Week 3: at Seattle Seahawks

The Cowboys struggled in almost all aspects. Dak Prescott threw 2 interceptions and Ezekiel Elliott had a fumble late in the game. The only highlight was a Tavon Austin touchdown. This loss dropped the Cowboys to 1–2 on the season.

Week 4: vs. Detroit Lions

The Cowboys bounced back from the previous week. Elliott totaled 240 yards and a touchdown. Prescott had 2 passing touchdowns. Geoff Swaim scored the first touchdown of his career. Maher went 4/4 on field goals, including a 38-yarder that won the game as time expired. This win improved the Cowboys to 2–2 on the season.

Week 5: at Houston Texans

The Cowboys controversially punted in overtime and allowed the Texans to take the ball down the field and win the game. This loss dropped the Cowboys to 2–3.

Week 6: vs. Jacksonville Jaguars

The Cowboys found their winning ways and got back on track after losing the previous week. The defense got after Blake Bortles and only yielded 7 points. Cole Beasley put up 101 receiving yards and 2 touchdowns. The offense dominated the entire game, and scored 40 points off one of the league's best defenses. This win improved the Cowboys to 3–3 on the season.

Week 7: at Washington Redskins

Brett Maher attempted to kick a 52-yard field goal in the dying seconds to tie the game, but it hit the left upright. This loss dropped them to 3–4.

Week 9: vs. Tennessee Titans

This was Amari Cooper's first game as a Cowboy as he was traded from the Oakland Raiders for a first-round pick, but the Titans pulled away late and won the game. This loss dropped them to 3–5 on the season.

This was also Jason Witten's first return to AT&T Stadium. Witten played as a tight-end for the Dallas Cowboys for some part of the 2000s and much of the 2010s.

Week 10: at Philadelphia Eagles

In desperate need of a road win to keep their season alive, the game began with Leighton Vander Esch picking off Carson Wentz. The game would be neck-to-neck without the Cowboys trailing. As they led 27–20 on the last play, the ball was lateraled to Golden Tate, but was stopped in progress to allow the Cowboys to win. This win not only improved them to 4–5, but it also improved their chances of being contenders.

Week 11: at Atlanta Falcons

Brett Maher kicked a game-winning field goal as time expired. The Cowboys improved to 5–5 with this win. Rookie linebacker Leighton Vander Esch put up a stellar performance with his 2nd interception in two weeks, which set up a crucial Ezekiel Elliott touchdown run. This was the Cowboys first win over the Falcons since 2009, and first in Atlanta since 2006.

Week 12: vs. Washington Redskins
NFL on Thanksgiving Day

The Cowboys got revenge on their division rivals during the game. Dak Prescott connected with Amari Cooper for a 90-yard catch and run touchdown in the third quarter. With the win, the Cowboys moved to 6-5 and gained possession of first place in the NFC East.

Week 13: vs. New Orleans Saints

The Cowboys defense shut down Drew Brees and the Saints red hot offense, limiting their offense to a season low 10 points and upsetting the Saints. Jourdan Lewis made the game-clinching interception with only 2:08 left to play in 4th quarter to seal the victory. This win improved the Cowboys to 7–5 on the season.

Week 14: vs. Philadelphia Eagles

After a grueling back-and-forth match, the Cowboys won in overtime. This was their 1st overtime victory since the 2016 season, which was, coincidentally, also a 29–23 home win against the Eagles. Brett Maher made a successful 62-yard field goal attempt, which was a franchise record for Dallas and tied for the third longest in NFL history. Amari Cooper had his best game as a Cowboy thus far, catching 10 passes for 217 yards and 3 touchdowns.

With the win, the Cowboys improved to 8–5, extended their lead in the NFC East to 2 games, and swept the Eagles for the first time since 2012.

Week 15: at Indianapolis Colts

The Cowboys were shut out for the first time since 2003, the offense couldn't keep up with the Colts defense. This loss dropped the Cowboys to 8–6 on the season.

Week 16: vs. Tampa Bay Buccaneers

The Cowboys bounced back at home against the Buccaneers. Jaylon Smith made the highlight play of the game, recovering a fumble from Jameis Winston and returning it 69 yards for a touchdown. With this win, the Cowboys improved to 9–6 on the season and clinched the NFC East for the third time in 5 years.

Week 17: at New York Giants

The Cowboys earned a hard-fought win. The defense picked off two passes from Eli Manning while forcing a fumble for a turnover. Blake Jarwin had the best game of his career, accounting for 3 of the Cowboys' touchdowns. The Cowboys won the game after a game-winning touchdown pass from Dak Prescott to Cole Beasley along with the ensuing 2-point conversion from Prescott to Michael Gallup. With this win, the Cowboys finished 10–6. This marks the first time the Cowboys have recorded 3 consecutive winning seasons since they did so from 2007 to 2009.

Standings

Division

Conference

Postseason

NFC Wild Card Playoffs: vs. (5) Seattle Seahawks

The Dallas Cowboys received the ball first after the Seattle Seahawks chose to defer during the coin toss. The resulting drive ended in a Brett Maher 39 yard field goal. The next three drives for both teams ended in punts. However, the Seahawks responded with a 27-yard Sebastian Janikowski field goal, thanks to 66 yards passing by Russell Wilson on the drive. After a missed 57 yard field goal by Maher, Seattle responded by a Janikowski 42 yard field goal. Dallas responded by a 75-yard drive which culminated in an 11-yard touchdown pass by Dak Prescott to Michael Gallup to lead 10–6. After both teams exchanged punts twice, Russell Wilson ran 4 yards into the end zone and converted a two-point conversion to lead the Cowboys 14–10. The Cowboys responded with an Ezekiel Elliott 1 yard touchdown run to retake the lead 17–14. After another Dallas touchdown drive, highlighted by a 16-yard Prescott scramble at 3rd-and-14 followed by Prescott scoring on a 1-yard run, Seattle responded with a touchdown and two-point conversion to narrow Dallas's lead to 24–22. The Cowboys sealed the game when Cole Beasley recovered an onside kick attempt of the Seahawks with only 1:17 left in the game. Ezekiel Elliott totaled a combined 169 yards both through the air and on the ground and also scored a touchdown.

With this win, the Cowboys won their first playoff game since 2014 and advanced to the divisional round. This is also the first playoff victory of the Dak Prescott and Ezekiel Elliott era.

The only sour note on a good Dallas win was a serious leg injury to wide receiver Allen Hurns halfway through the first quarter, suffered after a reception when he was tackled by Seahawks safety Bradley McDougald. Hurns was carted off the field and taken straight to a hospital. After the game, general manager Jerry Jones told the media that Hurns had broken his ankle and fibula.

NFC Divisional Playoffs: at (2) Los Angeles Rams

The Cowboys defense couldn't contain the Rams' offense. Ezekiel Elliott only got 47 rushing yards. With this loss, the Cowboys season ended. This also extended their streak of road playoff losses to 8 in a row.

References

External links
 
 

Dallas
Dallas Cowboys seasons
Dallas Cowboys
NFC East championship seasons
2010s in Dallas
2018 in Texas